= Operation Bittersweet =

- Operation Name: Operation Bittersweet
- Type: sting operation for embargoed goods

Roster
- Planned by: United States Department of Justice

Mission
- Target: Violators of the 1984 U.S. Customs Service's restriction on the importation of sugar products
- Objective: to catch and prosecute companies and individuals that were illegally importing sugar into the U.S.

Timeline
- Date executed: 1980s

Results

Accounting

Operation Bittersweet was a sting operation in the 1980s in which the U.S. Department of Justice caught companies illegally importing sugar from foreign countries in violation of the U.S. Customs Service's 1984 restrictions on the importation of sugar products. The sting resulted in 30 companies being implicated and over US$16 million in fines.
